Gateshead West was a parliamentary constituency represented in the House of Commons of the Parliament of the United Kingdom from 1950 to 1983. It elected one Member of Parliament (MP) by the first past the post system of election.

History
Gateshead West, as could be inferred from the name, formed the western part of the Borough of Gateshead, now in Tyne and Wear. The constituency was created by the Representation of the People Act 1948 for the 1950 general election when the existing Gateshead seat was split in two. It was abolished for the 1983 general election, when the majority of the electorate was included in the new constituency of Tyne Bridge, which also included central areas of Newcastle-upon-Tyne. Remaining areas were transferred to Gateshead East.

It returned Labour MPs for the entire period of its existence.

Boundaries

1950–1955 

 The County Borough of Gateshead wards of Central, North, North West, West, and West Central.

1955–1964 

 The County Borough of Gateshead wards of Central, East Central, North, North East, North West, West, and West Central.

The East Central and North East wards were transferred from Gateshead East.

1964-1983 

 The County Borough of Gateshead wards of Askew, Bensham, Chandless, Claremont, Riverside, Saltwell, Shipcote, and Teams.

Minor changes to reflect redistribution of local authority wards.

Members of Parliament

Election results

Elections in the 1970s

Elections in the 1960s

Elections in the 1950s

See also 

 History of parliamentary constituencies and boundaries in Durham

References 

Constituencies of the Parliament of the United Kingdom established in 1950
Constituencies of the Parliament of the United Kingdom disestablished in 1983
Politics of Gateshead
Parliamentary constituencies in Tyne and Wear (historic)